Josiah Martin (23 April 1737 – 13 April 1786) was a British Army officer and colonial official who served as the ninth and last British governor of North Carolina from 1771 to 1776.

Early life and career
Martin was born in Dublin, Ireland, of the son of Samuel Martin, a planter well established on the Caribbean island of Antigua, third son of his father's second marriage. His elder half-brother Samuel Martin (1714–1788) was secretary to the Treasury in London. Another brother Sir Henry Martin (1735–1794) was for many years naval commissioner at Portsmouth and Comptroller of the Royal Navy. Sir Henry was father of Thomas Byam Martin.

This Josiah Martin's uncle, also Josiah Martin (1699–1778) but born in Antigua, left Antigua after 1750 and settled at Far Rockaway, Long Island. He was a member of the first board of trustees for King's College (now Columbia University) in 1754 and a member of the royal council of New York in 1754–1755. From 1759 to 1764, he was on the council of the governor of the Province of New York. Josiah Martin, the younger, married his first cousin Elizabeth Martin, daughter of the elder Josiah Martin of Long Island, in 1761. At first undecided, he became an ensign in the British Army in 1756, rising to the rank of Lieutenant-Colonel in 1769.

On 29 December 1758, Josiah was appointed to the New York Council, a position once held by his uncle. Because of his trips to London and Antigua, the council, in November 1762, temporarily replaced him with Lawrence Read, superseded in turn by Lawrence's father Joseph Read, to sit in Martin's place until he returned. He was given "a full year to determine whether he will return to the council from the West Indies."

Governor of North Carolina
On 1 March 1771, Martin received his appointment from The Crown as Governor of the Province of North Carolina, succeeding James Hasell. Handicapped by illness, he remained in New York and was unable to present himself in the governor's palace at New Bern until Monday, 12 August 1771.

Governor Martin tried to give the North Carolinians useful and fair government, but he was hampered by his instructions from Lord Hillsborough, and later by Lord Dartmouth. Tryon left a legacy to Martin of five major problems that plagued North Carolina. These problems were
 the fiscal and psychological effects of the War of the Regulation;
 the unsettled and expensive dispute between the Carolinas about their mutual boundary line;
 the struggle over the court law bills and the judiciary, especially the attachment of the property of debtors who had never lived in the province;
 the old quorum trouble in the House of Commons that caused conflict between the House and the governor; and
 the conflict over the selection of the chief personnel of the provincial government by the crown rather than through the assembly.

After his home was attacked by Whigs on 24 April 1775, he sent his family to his in-laws' home in New York and took refuge on board the sloop-of-war HMS Cruizer, transferring his headquarters to Fort Johnston on the Cape Fear River. When the Mecklenburg Resolves were published in May 1775, Martin transmitted a copy to England, which he described as "setting up a system of rule and regulation subversive of his majesty's government." Martin then requested a supply of arms and ammunition from General Thomas Gage in Boston. In July 1775, a plot instigated by Martin to arm the slaves was discovered. In retaliation, John Ashe led a group of colonists against Fort Johnston on 20 July. Martin was forced to flee aboard the Cruizer while the colonists destroyed the fort. Martin remained off the coast of North Carolina, directing the rising of the Loyalists, whom he supplied with weapons brought from England.

Later life
After two attempts during the Carolina campaign to re-establish his administration were turned back, Martin, who was then in ill health due to fatigue, left for Long Island and then England. He died in London in April 1786 and was buried at St George's Hanover Square Church, City of Westminster, London, England.

Honors
Martin County, North Carolina, is named after him.

References

External links

 Josiah Martin at the North Carolina History Project

1737 births
1786 deaths
68th Regiment of Foot officers
British Anglicans
British Army personnel of the French and Indian War
British Army personnel of the Seven Years' War
British officials in the American Revolution
Burials at St George's, Hanover Square
Cheshire Regiment officers
Governors of North-Carolina (1712–1776)
Military personnel from Dublin (city)